Rhoda Grant (born 26 June 1963) is a Scottish politician who has served as a Member of the Scottish Parliament (MSP) for the Highlands and Islands region since 2007, having previously represented the same region from 1999 to 2003. A member of the Scottish Labour and Co-operative Party, she has been Shadow Cabinet Secretary for Rural Economy and Tourism since 2021.

Early life and career 
Grant was born in 1963 in Stornoway, Outer Hebrides and studied for a degree in social sciences from the Open University. Prior to her election, Grant worked for the trade union UNISON and Highland Regional Council.

Political career   
In the 1999 Scottish Parliament election, Grant was elected to a list seat for the Highlands and Islands region. In the 2003 election, she fought the Inverness East, Nairn and Lochaber constituency but came second to Fergus Ewing of the Scottish National Party, who held the seat by 1,000 votes. In that election, she also lost her regional list seat.

In the 2007 Scottish Parliament election, Grant was again elected as a regional list MSP for Highlands and Islands, as the Scottish Green Party's vote share collapsed and Labour won three list seats, and she was re-elected in the 2011 election.

In 2013, Grant campaigned for filters to be put in place to make the viewing or downloading of internet pornography more difficult, arguing there had been a significant connection between pornography, the sex industry, abuse and violence against women.

Grant was appointed Scottish Labour Spokesperson for Women and Equality by new leader Richard Leonard on 19 November 2017, and was also its parliamentary business manager between 19 November 2017 and 4 October 2018, when she was succeeded by Neil Findlay. She became Spokesperson for Finance on 2 September 2019. She served as Spokesperson for Eradication of Poverty and Inequality from April to November 2020 and Spokesperson for Justice from November 2020 to March 2021.

Grant defended Richard Leonard after calls for him to resign in September 2020, saying:

Grant nominated Monica Lennon in the 2021 Scottish Labour leadership election.

Personal life 
Grant is married and has a sister whom she cat-sits for.

References

External links 
 
 Rhoda Grant website
 Caithness News Bulletins Elections 2007 Caithness Community website

1963 births
Living people
Labour Co-operative MSPs
Scottish trade unionists
Alumni of the Open University
Female members of the Scottish Parliament
People from Stornoway
Members of the Scottish Parliament 1999–2003
Members of the Scottish Parliament 2007–2011
Members of the Scottish Parliament 2011–2016
People educated at Plockton High School
Members of the Scottish Parliament 2016–2021
20th-century Scottish women politicians
Members of the Scottish Parliament 2021–2026